The Internationale Musikakademie für Solisten (International Academy for Soloists, IMAS) is a music school located in Hanover with master classes for highly talented young soloists who are aiming for an international career. It is one of the leading training centres for soloists in Germany . The offered courses change annually in the fields of piano, violin, singing, violoncello, French horn and Chamber music.

Activity and organisation 
So far, IMAS has supported more than 1000 highly talented students from 35 nations (as of January 2014).

The nine-day individual courses begin in autumn and end with a final concert in the castle's ballroom. In order to keep the costs of participation low, the students live with citizens of Bückeburg during the course. The board of directors of the Trägerverein consists of Ulrike Fontaine (chairwoman), Peter Christoph Loewe (deputy chairman), Ines Gräfin von der Schulenburg (finances), Bernd Goetzke (artistic director) and Alexander, Prince of Schaumburg-Lippe (honorary chairman). A seven-member board of trustees assists the board of directors. The pianist Boris Kuznetsov is responsible for project management.

History 
The non-profit association, "Internationale Musikakademie für Solisten", was founded in 1978 by Reimar Dahlgrün, professor emeritus of the University of Music in Hannover, together with colleagues. During the first ten years, teaching was held in the Herzog August Bibliothek in Wolfenbüttel. In 1986 Alexander Fürst zu Schaumburg-Lippe brought the academy into the Schloss Bückeburg. In 1982, Gotthard Kronstein took over as managing director.

Karl-Heinz Kämmerling was responsible for the overall artistic direction for about three decades. At the end of 2010 Bernd Goetzke became his successor.

Personalities

Docents 
Source, if not stated otherwise:

Piano
 Guido Agosti
 Bernd Glemser
 Bernd Goetzke
 Karl-Heinz Kämmerling
 Zsigmond Szathmáry

Violin
 Ana Chumachenco
 André Gertler
 Yfrah Neaman
 Igor Ozim
 Kurt Saßmannshaus
 Krzysztof Węgrzyn

Violoncello
 Julius Berger
 Wolfgang Boettcher
 André Navarra
 Wolfgang Emanuel Schmidt

French Horn
 Stefan Dohr
 Marie-Luise Neunecker

Bassoon
 Klaus Thunemann

Singing
 Judith Beckmann
 Helen Donath
 Christiane Iven
 Sena Jurinac
 Helena Łazarska
 Charlotte Lehmann
 Birgit Nilsson
 Rudolf Piernay
 Elisabeth Schwarzkopf
 Mitsuko Shirai
 Hildegard Uhrmacher
 Dunja Vejzovic
 Lars Woldt

Students 
Source, if not stated otherwise:

Piano
 Sheila Arnold (* 1970), professor at the Hochschule für Musik und Tanz Köln
 Markus Becker
 Luiza Borac
 Konstanze Eickhorst
 Alexej Gorlatch
 Ayumi Janke
 Yo Kosuge
 Roland Krüger
 Igor Levit
 Alice Sara Ott
 Ragna Schirmer
 Lars Vogt

Violin
 Ulrike-Anima Mathé

Violoncello
 Marcio Carneiro
 Manuel Fischer-Dieskau

Singing
 Christiane Iven

References

External links 
 Website of the IMAS
 Treff der Hochbegabten Schaumburger Nachrichten, 11 September 2013

1978 establishments in West Germany
Music schools in Germany
Culture in Hanover
Hochschule für Musik, Theater und Medien Hannover